Jesse Newman (born September 23, 1982) is a former Canadian football guard for the Calgary Stampeders and BC Lions of the Canadian Football League (CFL). He was drafted in the first round with the 3rd overall pick in the 2008 CFL Draft by the Calgary Stampeders. He played college football for UL Lafayette. He retired from professional football on June 4, 2010, for personal reasons. Following Calgary's bye week later that season, Newman announced that he was coming out of retirement, much to the chagrin of some of the team's players. Consequently, Newman was traded to the BC Lions on September 4 for a second-round pick in the 2011 CFL Draft as well as a conditional fourth-round pick in the 2012 CFL Draft.

References

External links
Just Sports Stats
BC Lions bio

1982 births
Living people
BC Lions players
Calgary Stampeders players
Canadian football offensive linemen
Players of Canadian football from British Columbia
Canadian football people from Vancouver
American football offensive linemen
Canadian players of American football
Louisiana Ragin' Cajuns football players